Maulana Zahid Ur Rashdi (born; 28 October 1948) (Urdu: مولانا زاہد الراشدی) is Pakistani Islamic scholar, writer, editor, columnist and founding director of Al-Sharia Academy, Gujranwala. He has served as various positions in different political and educational institutions.

Early life and education
Rashdi born in Ghakhar to Muhammad Sarfaraz Khan Safdar. He got Hifz ul Quran from Madrasa Tajweed-ul-Quran Ghakhar, Dars-i Nizami from Jamia Nusrat Ul Uloom Gujranwala under his father Muhammad Sarfaraz Khan Safdar and uncle Abdul Hameed Swati. He also studied at Wafaq ul Madaris Al-Arabia, Pakistan.

Career
He served as a teacher of Dars-i Nizami at Madrasa Anwar-ul-Uloom Gujranwala from 1970 to 1990, currently serving as president and Sheikh-ul-Hadees of Jamia Nusrat Ul Uloom Gujranwala since 2000. He also served as a member of the National Academic Council of Institute of Policy Studies, Islamabad.

Political career
Zahid Ur Rashdi served as information secretary of Jamiat Ulema-e-Islam Pakistan (as Deputy of Mufti Mahmood from 1975 to 1980), Deputy Secretary-General of Jamiat Ulema-e-Islam Pakistan from 1980 to 1990, Secretary-General Pakistan National Alliance, Punjab from 1977 to 1979 and Vice President Islami Jamhoori Ittehad, Punjab from 1987 to 1990.

Literary works
Since 1965, he has published more than 2000 articles on scientific, political and national issues in various newspapers and magazines and book collections on various topics.

 Khutbat e Rashdi 
 Asr e Hazir Mein Ijtihad
 Deeni Madaris Ka Nisab o Nizam

Award and honors
 Tamgha-e-Imtiaz in Education (2015)
 Former member of the Institute of Policy Studies (Pakistan)
 He is also delivering lecturer as a guest in various institutions.

References

Living people
1948 births
People from Gujranwala District
Pakistani Islamic religious leaders
Pakistani Sunni Muslim scholars of Islam
Muslim missionaries
Pakistani religious writers
Recipients of Tamgha-e-Imtiaz